Sakya Monastery, also known as Pel Sakya ("White Earth" or "Pale Earth") is a Buddhist monastery situated in Sa'gya Town (ས་སྐྱ་), Sa'gya County, about 127 km west of Shigatse in the Tibet Autonomous Region.

History 

As the seat of the Sakya (or Sakyapa) school of Tibetan Buddhism, it was founded in 1073, by Khön Könchok Gyalpo (1034–1102), originally a Nyingmapa monk of the powerful noble family of the Tsang, who became the first Sakya Trizin. The "southern monastery" was founded under the orders of Drogön Chögyal Phagpa in 1268, across a river from the earlier structures. 130,000 workers were reportedly drafted for its construction. Its powerful abbots governed Tibet during the 13th and the 14th centuries under the overlordship of the Mongol Yuan dynasty after the downfall of the Tibetan Empire, until they were eclipsed by the rise of the new Kagyu and Gelug schools of Tibetan Buddhism. Most of the southern monastery was burned down in the 16th century. It was only restored to its previous size in 1948.

Its architecture is quite different from that of temples in Lhasa and Yarlung. The only surviving ancient building is the Lhakang Chempo or Sibgon Trulpa. Originally a cave in the mountainside, it was built in 1268 by dpon-chen Sakya Sangpo  and restored in the 16th century. It contains some of the most magnificent surviving artwork in all of Tibet, which appears not to have been damaged in recent times. The Gompa grounds cover more than 18,000 square metres, while the huge main hall covers some 6,000 square metres.

After the March 10th, 1959 Lhasa uprising to protect the 14th Dalai Lama from the Communist Chinese People's Liberation Army, the majority of Sakya Monastery's monks were forced to leave. As Namkhai Norbu states in his book; "previously there were about five hundred monks in the Great Sakya Monastery, but by the end of 1959 only 36 aged monks remained." The northern monastery was destroyed during the Cultural Revolution, while the southern half escaped from destruction. The monastery was renovated and rebuilt in 2002.

Das Sharat Chandra writes:

As to the great library of Sakya, it is on shelves along the walls of the great hall of the Lhakhang chen-po. There are preserved here many volumes written in gold letters; the pages are six feet long by eighteen inches in breadth. In the margin of each page are illuminations, and the first four volumes have in them pictures of the thousand Buddhas. These books are bound in iron. They were prepared under orders of the Emperor Kublai Khan, and presented to the Phagpa lama on his second visit to Beijing.

There is also preserved in this temple a conch shell with whorls turning from left to right [in Tibetan, Ya chyü dungkar ], a present from Kublai to Phagpa. It is only blown by the lamas when the request is accompanied by a present of seven ounces of silver; but to blow it, or have it blown, is held to be an act of great merit."

Library and art 
Sakya Monastery houses a huge library of as many as 84,000 books on traditional stacks 60 metres long and 10 metres high. Most of them are Buddhist scriptures, although they also include works of literature, history, philosophy, astronomy, mathematics, agriculture and art. One scripture weighs more than 500 kg, the heaviest in the world. The collection also includes many volumes of palm-leaf manuscripts, which are well-preserved due to the region's arid climate. In 2003, the library was examined by the Tibetan Academy of Social Sciences. The monastery started to digitize the library in 2011. As of 2022, all books have been indexed, and more than 20% have been fully digitized. Monks now maintain a digital library for all scanned books and documents.

More than 3,000 murals in Sakya Monastery depict religious, historical and cultural themes, including valuable records of historical scenes such as Phagpa's meeting with Kublai Khan and the monastery's founding. The main library hall contains a 66-meter-long mural showing the life of Gautama Buddha. There are also more than 1,100 pieces of porcelain in the hall, dating from the Yuan dynasty to early 20th century.

Gallery

Sakya Monastery in India 
The 41st Sakya Trizin, Ngawang Kunga, the then throne holder of the Sakyapa went into exile in India in 1959 following the Chinese invasion of Tibet.  He has long lived in Dehra Dun, in the foothills of the Western Himalayas, where the Sakya Monastery was reestablished. He has been there with a number of senior monks and scholars, who also escaped from Tibet, joining the new Monastery and providing continuity to Sakya traditions.  These monks and scholars saved a number of the original scrolls from the original Sakya Monastery in Tibet and smuggled them to India for safekeeping. The Sakya Trizin and his followers have established several institutions in and around the Dehradun area, including a charitable hospital, a monastic college and a nunnery. Like all leaders of the Sakya school, the current Sakya Trizin is married. He has two sons, and the younger one, Dungsey Gyana Vajra, born 5 July 1979 in Dehra Dun, is director of the Sakya Monastery constructed in Dehra Dun.

References

External links 

Sakya monasteries and temples
Buddhist monasteries in Tibet
Buddhist temples in Tibet
1073 establishments in Asia
Major National Historical and Cultural Sites in Tibet
Ancient libraries
Rare book libraries